Shambulingaiah Ravi is an Indian National Congress activist, member of Karnataka Legislative Council and the president of Bangalore DCC Bank. He is a relative of D. K. Shivakumar.

See also 
TA/DA scam

References

External links 
S. Ravi affidavit
Further Reference

Living people
Members of the Karnataka Legislative Council
Indian National Congress politicians from Karnataka
1967 births